Deer Lake State Park is a Florida State Park located in Santa Rosa Beach, on CR 30A, in northwestern Florida. Its sister park is Grayton Beach State Recreation Area.

Recreational Activities
The park has such amenities as beaches, birding, fishing, picnicking areas, swimming and wildlife viewing.

References

External links
 Deer Lake State Park  at Florida State Parks
 Deer Lake State Park 
Coastal Dune Lakes Documentary

Parks in Walton County, Florida
State parks of Florida